Gymnopilus suberis is a species of mushroom in the family Hymenogastraceae. It was given its current name by mycologist Rolf Singer in 1951.

Phylogeny
This species is in the aeruginosus-luteofolius infrageneric grouping in the genus Gymnopilus.

See also

List of Gymnopilus species

References

External links
Gymnopilus suberis at Index Fungorum

subearlei